Hyalosperma cotula is a plant in the Asteraceae family, native to Western Australia, South Australia, and Victoria. It was first described in 1837 by George Bentham as Helichrysum cotula, but was transferred to the genus, Hyalosperma, in 1989 by Paul Wilson.

It is a slender, erect, annual herb,  growing from 0.05 to 0.25 m high, in damp places. The white /yellow flowers may be seen from July to December.

References

External links 
 Hyalosperma cotula: occurrence data from the Australasian Virtual Herbarium

Gnaphalieae
Endemic flora of Australia